Belle vie or variant may refer to:

 La Belle Vie (1962 song), 1962 song, see The Good Life (1962 song)
 La belle vie (1983 album), 1983 record by Bill Baxter (band)
 La Belle Vie (1993 song), 1993 song from the Les Rita Mitsouko album Système D
 La Belle Vie (TF1 Musique song), 2013 song and single from the album Forever Gentlemen
 La Belle Vie (Damien Sargue song), 2013 single by Damien Sargue
 La Belle Vie (1963 film), see List of films shot at the Palace of Versailles

See also
 La Vie est Belle (disambiguation)
 Bella Vita (disambiguation)
 Beautiful Life (disambiguation)
 Belleview (disambiguation)